Katalin Rodriguez-Ogren (maiden name Katalin Rodriguez Zamiar, best known as Katalin Zamiar) (born August 12, 1971 in Chicago) is an American martial artist, sportswriter, fitness instructor, gym owner and martial arts actress.

Life and career
Katalin Zamiar holds a degree in anthropology from the University of Illinois at Urbana-Champaign, where she became a forensic science teacher.

She has owned POW! Mixed Martial Arts and Chicago Krav Maga training centers since 2001. Along with teaching at her training center in downtown Chicago, she has often covered the UFC for Grappling magazine, focusing primarily on features and interviews. She has published more than 150 articles in various martial arts magazines including Black Belt and Inside Kung Fu, and has been featured in magazines such as Shape, Allure and Self. She has worked as an international fitness and martial arts presenter and has spent some time as a spokesperson for the Martial Arts brand Revgear. She has also written conditioning materials and manuals and can be seen in more than a number of workout fitness/martial arts videos. Her other endeavors have included a summer training camp for upcoming basketball players and she working with non-for-profits. In 2014, she wrote the book Weight Training for Martial Arts.

Acting
Zamiar remains best known for her characterizations of the three female ninja characters Kitana, Mileena, and Jade in the 1993 fighting video game Mortal Kombat II. MKII creators Ed Boon and John Tobias were members of Zamiar's fitness club, and Zamiar's younger brother Alex (who was a Mortal Kombat fan) contacted Boon and Tobias suggesting Zamiar for the role. She learned kung fu for the role and filmed moves for both Kitana and Mileena, although the video shoot costume was Kitana's blue so John Tobias created Mileena by altering the character colors to purple. The character of Jade was Zamiar's own idea, and that was created with a palette swap from blue to green. In 1997, Zamiar, together with Philip Ahn (Shang Tsung in MKII) and Elizabeth Malecki (Sonya in Mortal Kombat), filed a lawsuit against Midway Games for royalties for the home ports of the game, a case in which Midway emerged victorious.

In 1995, she and fellow Mortal Kombat actors Ho Sung Pak (Liu Kang in MKII and her boyfriend at the time), Daniel Pesina, and Phillip Ahn appeared in Thea Realm Fighters, a never-released fighting game produced exclusively for the Atari Jaguar, as well having been in the also unreleased game Chi Yong that was planned for the PlayStation in 1994. In 1996, she portrayed a Jade-like ninja woman character named Chae Lee in the fighting game Catfight.

In 2003, she played a minor part in the low-budget martial arts film Book of Swords; in a cameo nod to her Mortal Kombat alter egos, Katalin once again portrayed a female ninja character, dressed in similar clothing as her MKII counterparts and even wielding two sai as Mileena does (the movie also starred Pesina, Pak, and another Mortal Kombat actor, Richard Divizio, all of whom are seen in MK-style clothing/roles throughout the movie). She has reunited with the rest of the MKII cast for the 20th anniversary event at the Galloping Ghost Arcade.

References

External links
 Official website (archived)
 Katalin Rodriguez Ogren's blog
 

1971 births
Actresses from Chicago
American exercise instructors
American female karateka
American people of Cuban descent
American female taekwondo practitioners
American video game actresses
American women sportswriters
Krav Maga practitioners
Living people
Sportswriters from Illinois
American women non-fiction writers
Shōrin-ryū practitioners
21st-century American women